Ebba-Elisabeth Busch (formerly Busch Thor while married; born 11 February 1987) is a Swedish politician serving as the Deputy Prime Minister of Sweden and Minister for Energy, Business and Industry since October 2022. She has served as Leader of the Christian Democrats since April 2015.

Early life and education 
Born to a Swedish mother and Norwegian father, Busch identifies as both Norwegian and Swedish. Growing up in Gunsta, near Uppsala, she was a student at the Christian Livets Ord primary school. She later studied the IB Diploma Programme at Katedralskolan in Uppsala, and peace and conflict studies at Uppsala University.

She is a member of the Church of Sweden.

Political career 

Busch was the municipal party political secretary for the Christian Democrats councillor Gustaf von Essen in the Uppsala Municipality. In 2009, she assumed responsibility for the budget when Essen went on sick leave, and at the age of 22 she became a substitute municipal councillor. Ahead of the election for municipal councillors in Uppsala in 2010, the party suggested that Busch should be placed third on the election ballot, while the incumbent councillor Gustav von Essen would be first. The party youth organization chairman Charlie Weimers, who did not get to vote in the election, wrote that he thought the party should have Busch at the top of the ballot.

In the end, a closed vote within the party decided the top name on the ballot, and Busch beat von Essen by a margin of two votes. At the election, Busch received 1,679 votes, against only 220 for von Essen. Busch served as vice chairman of the Christian Democrat youth organisation until 5 June 2011.

Busch made several comments to the media during 2010 criticizing the then party chairman Göran Hägglund, and what she perceived as his weak leadership following the 2006 General Election. Ahead of the January 2012 leadership election within the party, she supported Hägglund's opponent Mats Odell. She was also herself a candidate for the post of deputy party chairman at the same election, but lost to Maria Larsson. Alf Svensson, former party leader, has described his disappointment with Busch's worldview.

Party leader (2016–present) 
In 2015, Busch was announced as the suggested successor of Göran Hägglund as party leader of the Christian Democratic party, and was formally elected on 25 April. Her time as leader was long characterized by an uncertainty on how to profile the party, and consistent low numbers in opinion polls. Her early attempts to gain votes by adopting tougher positions on immigration and law and order were thwarted when the Moderate Party usurped that space. This was followed by a return to a focus on more traditional Christian Democratic issues, such as healthcare and family politics. At the same time, Busch continued to position the party in a more conservative direction on other issues like the opposition to Mosque prayer calls and gender science at preschools. At the same time, she also came under attack from social conservatives inside her own party for participating in the Stockholm Pride Parade.

The Christian Democrats received only 2.9% in a big opinion poll published in May 2018, and the party's fortunes looked bleak. But support quickly grew as the election campaign got under way with the first debate in mid-August. Busch's strong performance in this and other debates was credited in large part for the party's surge in the polls. She ended up leading her party to its best electoral performance in 12 years, finishing well above the 4% threshold. In March 2019, Busch announced that her party was ready to start negotiations with the Sweden Democrats in the Riksdag, making her the first party leader to express a willingness to cooperate with the SD.

Political views

Migration 
In 2016 Busch, in a TV-debate with the party leaders of the other seven parties, said that asylum seekers who commit sexual harassment must be rejected and must be deported with a hint that the government accepts the abuse.

When interviewed by Dagens Nyheter in February of 2018, Busch claimed that immigration to Sweden has led to a crisis regarding values and later on, ahead of the 2018 Swedish general election, said that heading towards multiculturalism is a mistake and argued against it.

Busch reiterated her party’s new harsher stance on immigration in 2019 in a debate article with her party’s spokesperson on migration, Hans Eklind, where they wrote that they deem it necessary to decrease the amount of granted asylums in Sweden to the same level of neighboring countries, which would result in a much smaller immigration.

Foreign policy 
Busch is positive about free trade and supports EU cooperation, but believes that the principle of subsidiarity must be protected and is against increased supranationalism in social matters and giving the EU taxation rights. She believes that Turkish membership in the EU should be rejected.

Busch has criticized former Foreign Minister Margot Wallström's stance towards Israel and handling of the Israel-Palestine conflict, arguing that Wallström has been too one-sided and debated for Palestine rather than acting as a diplomat. She wishes to move the Swedish embassy in Israel from Tel Aviv to Jerusalem and was positive about the US decision to move its embassy there in 2017.

Minister and Deputy Prime Minister (2022–present) 
Since 18 October 2022, she is the Minister for Energy as well as Minister for  Business and Industry in the Ulf Kristersson Cabinet. She is also Deputy Prime Minister of Sweden for the same cabinet.

On 27 October 2022, Busch and prime minister Ulf Kristersson announced a 55 billion (SEK) subsidy compensation in connection to the high increase of power bills, the subsidy will only be paid out in the energy price zones three and four in the southern parts of Sweden.

Personal life
In 2013, Ebba Busch married IK Sirius football player Niklas Thor. She has a son, Birger, born in May 2015 and a daughter, Elise, born in February 2017.

On 5 December 2019, Busch announced on her Instagram account that she and her husband had filed for divorce.

She is a Protestant and a member of the Church of Sweden.

Defamation conviction 
In March 2021, a criminal investigation was launched against Busch for defamation against the opposing counsel in a legal conflict relating to Busch's purchase of a house. Busch pointed out the opposing lawyer's own criminal conviction from 15 years prior. The lawyer sued Busch for defamation, as Swedish law allows even true claims about another person to count as defamation.

Busch pleaded guilty to a charge of grave defamation in July 2021 and sentenced to probation and a SEK 60,000 fine.

References

External links 

Official website

|-
 
|-

|- 

|-

|-

|-

|-

1987 births
Deputy Prime Ministers of Sweden
Female critics of feminism
Living people
Members of the Riksdag 2018–2022
Members of the Riksdag 2022–2026
Members of the Riksdag from the Christian Democrats (Sweden)
Politicians from Uppsala
Swedish Lutherans
Swedish Ministers for Energy
Swedish Ministers for Industry
Swedish people of Norwegian descent
Women government ministers of Sweden
Women members of the Riksdag
21st-century Swedish women politicians